Odostomia trimariana is a species of sea snail, a marine gastropod mollusc in the family Pyramidellidae, the pyrams and their allies.

Distribution
This species occurs in the Pacific Ocean off the Tres Marias Islands, Mexico.

References

External links
 To World Register of Marine Species

trimariana
Gastropods described in 1932